International Student Week in Ilmenau is a student conference, held biennially in the town of Ilmenau, located in the district of Ilm-Kreis, Thuringia, Germany.

The conference welcomes participants from all parts of the world. The first ISWI was held in 1993. At the conference participants discuss topics and experience a broad cultural exchange. Around 400 participants from over 80 countries took part in ISWI 2015. The week includes big-ticket lectures by distinguished personalities, the most well-known speakers are until this day Robert Jungk, Joseph Weizenbaum, Helmut Schmidt and Konrad Zuse.

Each conference offers a wide range of cultural events, such as concerts, food festival, theme-based events and so on. These events mostly organized in collaboration various organisations based around the Ilmenau University of Technology.
The news coverage is done by the college radio station Radio hsf, which broadcasts 24/10 during the conference.

ISWI also stands for the name of the organizing organization, 'Initiative Solidarische Welt Ilmenau' e.V. or ‘Initiative for World Solidarity Ilmenau’
which is a non-governmental non-profit organization which aims to: "be an initiative for a more peaceful world - to promote mutual understanding and respect". ISWI e.V is the primary organiser of the International Student Week in Ilmenau.

ISWI e.V is an active member of a network of student-organised conferences, 'Students ORganising Conferences Everywhere' SOrCE.

List of events

Initiative Solidarische Welt Ilmenau e.V. 

The Initiative Solidarische Welt Ilmenau e.V. (ISWI) is, according to its own statement, "committed to peace, international understanding as well as international solidarity and tolerance" and is a member of the SOrCE network (Students Organising Conventions Everywhere).

In addition to the main project - the International Students Week in Ilmenau (ISWI) - their activities range from organizing lectures on political education and readings to conducting international work camps and enriching campus life - be it the Kitchen Run or Professors Reading Christmas Stories.

These projects include:
 Ilmenau Dialogue Center
 Refugee Network
 Fernweh series (Intercultural evenings, Wanderlust lectures, Radio International)
 Professors reading Christmas stories
 Colorful Christmas
 Intercultural Dancing (Salsa and Bachata)
 Language Meeting (German, Spanish, Japanese, Persian)
 Kitchen Run
 Give-and-take festival
 Give-and-take shelf

References

External links
 

Festivals in Germany
Ilmenau